Company History
Moon Guitars was established in 1979 by Jimmy Moon in a small workshop on the Island of Arran in Scotland. His reputation grew quickly and he was soon making (mostly electric guitars) and repairing instruments for many of Scotland’s finest musicians. A move to Glasgow was made in 1985 and for the following ten years, the company produced mostly custom electric instruments for many of Scotland’s well-known bands including Big Country, Texas, Simple Minds, Wet Wet Wet and Del Amitri.  The next five years saw a change in the industry, and recognising this shift, Jimmy returned to his roots and began producing acoustic guitars and the entire mandolin family. Acoustic guitars range from Standard Series through to Master Grade instruments built with exotic timbers. The range also includes signature models for Bryan Adams and Scottish folk singer Dougie MacLean. Some current users of Moon acoustic instruments include: Adele, Ally McErlaine (Texas & Red Sky July), Bryan Adams, Dougie MacLean, Guy Berryman (Coldplay), Paolo Nutini, Trevor Rabin, Steve Earle, Peter Rowan, and Barry Wickens (Steve Harley and Cockney Rebel).

Present Day

The company has had varying levels of personnel over the years - but has consistently been assisted by Jimmy's wife - Joan - and finisher Stephen Devine - who started with the company in 1986.  In recent years, production has been scaled down and the company currently employs just Jimmy, Joan and Stephen.  Although a range of standard instruments are produced - Jimmy's focus has shifted more to one-off custom instruments.  All Moon instruments are hand made in their Glasgow workshop. 

External links

http://www.moonguitars.co.uk Company home page

https://www.youtube.com/watch?v=GP_j8hyQHY4 - short promotional film

Guitar makers
Musical instrument manufacturing companies of the United Kingdom